Laurent Bourgnon (April 16, 1966 – June 24, 2015) was a Swiss sailor and motorsports. He was an offshore sailing winning both the prestigious transadltanic races the Route du Rhum in 1994 and 1998 and the Transat Jacques-Vabre in 1997. He did a lot of his racing alongside his brother and fellow adventurer Yvan Bourgnon. He was born on 16 April 1966 in La Chaux-de-Fonds and disappeared after a diving accident on 24 June 2015 in Toau Atoll, French Polynesia.

Biography

Laurent Bourgnon was a multidisciplinary as a sailor, airplane and helicopter pilot, mechanic and developer, engineer and creator.

At the age of four, Laurent Bourgnon took his first steps on his parents' sailboat for a two-year trip to the Caribbean, then they left for three years from 13 to 16 years old, going around the world with their family. After crossing the Atlantic in 1986 at the age of 20 on a beach machine (Hobie Cat 18 of 5.40 m), Laurent Bourgnon embarked on the competition.

Winner of the biggest transoceanic events on his Primagaz trimaran including two Routes du Rhum, the Twostar, the Transat Jacques-Vabre, the Québec-Saint-Malo and many other events.

It also puts its know-how in aeronautics to develop and develop a new MCR 01 two-seater travel aircraft, very fast with a very long autonomy.

On June 24, 2015, he went missing during a dive in French Polynesia in the lagoon of Toau Atoll. The people on the support boat did not see him return to the surface and alerted the emergency services. The search (by helicopter and boats) is called off on the evening of June 28 after 4 days. According to the MRCC Polynesia "The most likely hypothesis is that it was carried to the bottom by a current coming out in a pass."

A Documentary entitled "The uncommon destiny of the Bourgnon brothers, icons of sailing" was produced in 2018.

Sailing achievements

1986 
Transatlantic Hobie Cat 18 beach catamaran with Fred Giraldi

1987
2nd in the Mini Transat 6.50, winner of the 2nd stage on a production boat against the faster prototypes

1988
Winner of the Solitaire du Figaro on his first attempt, the youngest of the competitors with one of the oldest boats

1994
 record for solo sailing across the North Atlantic on Primagaz in 7 days, 2 hours, 34 minutes and 42 seconds
 winner of the Route du Rhum
 record distance sailing in 24 hours alone on Primagaz with 540 nautical miles

1997
 winner of the Transat Jacques-Vabre

1998
 winner of the Route du Rhum

Motorsport achievements
 1999: First participation in the Dakar Rally
 2000: 13th in the Dakar Rally
 2001: 10th in the Dakar Rally
 2002: 13th in the Dakar Rally
 2003: 24th in the Dakar Rally in buggy
 2004: 23rd in the Dakar Rally in buggy
 2005: Dakar Rally in buggy (abandoned)
 2008: 9th Rally Tunisia

References

1966 births
2015 deaths
Living people
Sportspeople from Geneva
Swiss male sailors (sport)
IMOCA 60 class sailors
Swiss racing drivers
Off-road racing drivers
Dakar Rally drivers